Metatarsal ligaments may refer to:

 Dorsal metatarsal ligaments
 Interosseous metatarsal ligaments
 Plantar metatarsal ligaments
 Transverse metatarsal ligament